The 1901 Philadelphia Athletics season involved the A's finishing fourth in the American League with a record of 74 wins and 62 losses. The franchise that would become the modern Athletics originated in 1901 as a new franchise in the American League.

Before the 1901 season 
The Western League had been renamed the American League in 1900 by league president Bancroft (Ban) Johnson, and declared itself the second major league in 1901.

In 1901, Johnson created new franchises in the east and eliminated some franchises in the west. Philadelphia seems to have been a new franchise created to compete with the National League's Philadelphia Phillies. Former catcher Connie Mack was recruited to manage the club. Mack in turn persuaded Phillies minority owner Ben Shibe as well as others to invest in the team, which would be called the Philadelphia Athletics. He himself bought a 25 percent interest.

Regular season 
In 1901, Nap Lajoie jumped from the Phillies to the crosstown Philadelphia Athletics, owned by Connie Mack. Lajoie's batting average that year was .426, still a league record.  The same year Lajoie became the second major leaguer to be intentionally walked with the bases loaded after Abner Dalrymple in 1881.

Season standings

Record vs. opponents

Notable transactions 
 June 1901: Tom Leahy was signed as a free agent by the Athletics.
 July 1901: Tom Leahy was acquired from the Athletics by the Providence Grays.
 July 20, 1901: Snake Wiltse was signed as a free agent by the Athletics.

Roster

Player stats

Batting

Starters by position 
Note: Pos = Position; G = Games played; AB = At bats; H = Hits; Avg. = Batting average; HR = Home runs; RBI = Runs batted in

Other batters 
Note: G = Games played; AB = At bats; H = Hits; Avg. = Batting average; HR = Home runs; RBI = Runs batted in

Pitching

Starting pitchers 
Note: G = Games pitched; IP = Innings pitched; W = Wins; L = Losses; ERA = Earned run average; SO = Strikeouts

Other pitchers 
Note: G = Games pitched; IP = Innings pitched; W = Wins; L = Losses; ERA = Earned run average; SO = Strikeouts

Relief pitchers 
Note: G = Games pitched; W = Wins; L = Losses; SV = Saves; ERA = Earned run average; SO = Strikeouts

Notes

References 
1901 Philadelphia Athletics team page at Baseball Reference
1901 Philadelphia Athletics team page at www.baseball-almanac.com

Oakland Athletics seasons
Philadelphia Athletics season
Oakland